Retimohnia vernalis is a species of sea snail, a marine gastropod mollusc in the family Retimohniidae, the true whelks and the like.

References

External links 

Retimohniidae